Lilia Skala (née Sofer; 28 November 1896 – 18 December 1994) was an Austrian-American architect and actress known for her role in the film Lilies of the Field (1963), for which she received critical acclaim and an Academy Award nomination. During her career, Skala was also nominated for two Golden Globe Awards and a Primetime Emmy Award. 

Before Skala decided to be an actress, she practiced architecture as a profession. She was one of the first women architects in Austria and was the first female member of the Austrian Association of Engineers and Architects. She graduated from the University of Dresden Summa cum Laude; the institution is now known as the Technical University of Dresden, located in Germany. 

Her legendary life was the subject of the eponymous one-woman play Lilia!, written and performed by her granddaughter Libby Skala.

Early life and education
Skala was born Lilia Sofer in Vienna. Her mother, Katharina Skala, was Roman Catholic, and her father, Julius Sofer, was Jewish and worked as a manufacturer's representative for the Waldes Koh-i-noor Company. She was one of the first women to graduate in architecture and engineering from the University of Dresden, then practiced architecture professionally in Vienna.

In the late 1930s, she was forced to flee her Nazi-occupied homeland with her husband, Louis Erich Skala, and their two young sons. (Lilia and Erich adopted the non-Jewish sounding surname of Lilia's mother.)  Skala and her husband managed to escape (at different times) from Austria and eventually settled in the United States.

Career
According to a short memoir by Skala's son Peter, Skala developed an interest in theatre when she was 14 or 15 years old. However, Skala's parents were conservative and preferred Skala to pursue a career that was more "respectable". At that time, women were not allowed to study at The University of Vienna, so Skala's parents had to send her to the TU of Dresden in Germany. Although there is not sufficient information regarding why Skala choose architecture as her specific area of study, we do know that she excelled in a field that is traditionally dominated by men and graduated Summa cum Laude. Skala returned to Vienna and continued to practice architecture after the completion of her undergraduate degree. 

Skala never ceased searching for beauty, whether it was in architecture, or performance arts. About a year after the birth of her son, Peter Skala, she enrolled in acting lessons and rediscovered her long-lost passion for theatre. As her creative talents unfurled, Skala began to appear in countless television shows and serials from 1952 to 1985, such as The Alfred Hitchcock Hour in 1965. As Grand Duchess Sophie, Skala kept company on Broadway with Ethel Merman in Call Me Madam, not too many years after toiling in a Queens, New York zipper factory as a non-English-speaking refugee from Austria. She played Lisa Douglas’s mother, the Countess, on Green Acres in the 1960s.

She was nominated as Best Supporting Actress for her most famous role as the Mother Superior in 1963's Lilies of the Field. Skala also appeared in Ship of Fools (1965), Charly (1968), Deadly Hero (1976), Eleanor and Franklin (1976), Roseland (1977), Heartland (1979) Flashdance (1983), and House of Games (1987).

Death and legacy 
Skala died in 1994 in Bay Shore, New York of natural causes at age 98. A collection of architectural drawings that she had made as an architecture student at the University of Dresden from 1915 to 1920 was donated to the International Archives of Women in Architecture by her sons, Peter and Martin Skala. The collection is part of Skala's belongings when she fled the Nazis in 1939.

Personal life 
Skala was a Christian Scientist. She was introduced to the religion in Vienna in the 1920s.

Filmography

References

External links
  
 

1896 births
1994 deaths
American Christian Scientists
American film actresses
American musical theatre actresses
American television actresses
People from Englewood, New Jersey
People from Queens, New York
People from Bay Shore, New York
Actresses from Vienna
20th-century American actresses
Jewish emigrants from Austria to the United States after the Anschluss
Converts to Christian Science
TU Dresden alumni
Architects from Vienna
American women architects